Bowled Over!, released on 10 September 2011, is the 2011–12 robotics competition for FIRST Tech Challenge. Two alliances compete to score racquetballs into alliance-colored scoring goals. The name refers to two bowling balls on the field used for scoring points.

Alliances
In each match, the four teams competing are organized into red and blue alliances. The members of an alliance compete together to earn points.

Field

The field the robots play on is 12 ft by 12 ft in a diamond orientation with respect to the audience. In opposite corners (left and right to the audience) are ramps up to flat platforms on which robots start each match, colored for each alliance (called the home zone). On each platform is a home zone goal into which a bowling ball fits. In the corners without the platforms (front and back with respect to the audience) are the front and back parking zones. The two parking lot corners contain infrared beacons, which may guide the robots during the autonomous period. Between each home zone and the front parking zone is a protected area for each alliance.

Near the center of the field are 12 inverted ball crates that hold four containers of racquetballs (called ball tubes). There are 100 racquetballs, 12 of which contain a magnet. There are also two bowling balls, one of each color, near the field's center.

One highly effective method of scoring involved scissor lifts.  As there was no upper-end cap on the crate stacking bonus (see below) several teams built 10–18-foot scissor lifts that would lift a crate, scoring 200–400 points.  This score was virtually impossible to beat without the use of another scissor lift.

Scoring

Autonomous period
The first thirty seconds of play is the autonomous period, in which the robot acts autonomously. Points can be earned in this period in the following ways:

Driver-controlled period
The Driver-controlled period is a 2-minute period following the autonomous period in which the robot is controlled by human drivers. Points can be earned in the driver-controlled period in the following ways:

End game
The last thirty seconds of the driver-controlled period is called the End Game. Additional points can be earned in this period if an alliance can push their bowling ball into their home zone.

Advancement Criteria
During tournaments and championships, match wins are not the largest part of the advancement criteria. For example, the winner of the top judged award (the Inspire Award) ranks higher than the winner of the competition-based component (Winning Alliance Captain). Winning lesser judged awards (Think Award, Connect Award, etc.) also plays a part in the advancement order.  The criteria for the Inspire Award are "...match performance, observations made during interviews and in the pit area, and the team’s Engineering Notebook as equal factors...". Criteria for the other awards also include robot design, creativity, innovation, team performance, outreach and enthusiasm.

Notes

References

External links
 – Boston University Academy qualifier in Boston, Massachusetts on 8 January 2012, including magnet ball sorter and end game (Team 4299, "Battery Powered Picklejar Heads") and crate lifter (Team 4466, "Robots and Brainbots, Inc."). Only the driver-controlled ("teleop") period (including the end game) is shown in this video clip.
 – Teams 2818 ("G-FORCE") and 4240 ("Techno Clovers") at US Naval Academy qualifier in Annapolis, Maryland on 14 January 2012
Score board (same 437 point round)
Judge's-eye view of the three high-scoring crates (same 437 point round)
Photo of Teams 506 ("Pandara") and 4997 ("Masquerade"): high score to date of 584 Florida State Championship, 18 February 2012, Embry Riddle ICI Center, Daytona Beach, Florida.
Four robots lift seven crates higher than six feet – World Championship, April 2012
Record high score is 869 and was set in the final round of the Edison semi-finals

2011 in robotics